Old Xiang, also known as Lou-Shao (娄邵片 / 婁邵片), is a conservative Xiang Chinese language. It is spoken in the central areas of Hunan where it has been to some extent isolated from the neighboring Chinese languages, Southwestern Mandarin and Gan languages, and it retains the voiced plosives of Middle Chinese, which are otherwise only preserved in Wu languages like Shanghainese. See Shuangfeng dialect for details. Mao Zedong was a speaker of Old Xiang with his native Shaoshan dialect.

Dialects and regions
The Shuangfeng dialect is representative. 

Laba Miao (喇叭苗话) is an Old Xiang dialect spoken by the Laba Miao people of western Guizhou. In Guizhou, it is spoken in Qinglong County 晴隆县 (including in Changliu Township 长流乡), Pu'an County 普安县, Liuzhi County 六枝县, Shuicheng County, 水城县, and Panzhou 盘州.

References

Further reading
 

Xiang Chinese